Albouy is a surname. Notable people with the surname include:

Alexandre Albouy (born 1979), French rugby union player
Gérard Albouy (1912–1985), French milliner